Peter Aloysius McEvoy OBE (born 22 March 1953) was a leading British amateur golfer for many years, and is now a golf course designer, golf administrator, and golf writer.

Early life
McEvoy was born in London, but spent much of his childhood living near Turnberry where his father was a member of the famous links course. Even after moving back to London, he was able to play at the famous course.

Playing highlights
McEvoy won The Amateur Championship in both 1977 and 1978, which kicked off an impressive amateur golf career. He was a member of the Great Britain & Ireland Walker Cup team five times between 1977 and 1989. He also played on five Eisenhower Trophy teams, including 1988 when he won the individual event and GB&I won the team event. He was the low amateur at The Open Championship in 1978 and 1979, and was the first British amateur golfer to make the cut at the Masters Tournament, which he did in 1978. He also won the Lytham Trophy in 1979, the Brabazon Trophy in 1980 (tied with Ronan Rafferty), and was runner-up at the Amateur Championship in 1987.

Captains winning teams
McEvoy was named captain of the Great Britain & Ireland teams for the 1999 and 2001 Walker Cups, which won both times; this was the first time GB&I ever had consecutive wins in the event. McEvoy was also captain of the victorious Great Britain & Ireland team for the 1998 Eisenhower Trophy tournament, making McEvoy the only person to win the individual event, the team event as a player, and the team event as a captain. He captained again in 2000, and GB&I finished in second place. In 2002, when Ireland, England, Scotland, and Wales began sending separate teams to the tournament instead of a combined team, McEvoy was the captain of the English team.

Golf course design, and administration
McEvoy has been involved with golf course design for over 20 years, with his own company and in collaboration with others. He has worked on numerous courses around the world, including Fota Island Golf Course, which hosted the 2001 Irish Open and other Irish tournaments.

In 2002, McEvoy was named Chairman of The Royal and Ancient Golf Club of St Andrews Selection Committee, which chooses the members for Great Britain & Ireland amateur teams competing in various international events (such as the Walker Cup).

Honours
The Association of Golf Writers named McEvoy the winner of the 1978 Golf Writers' Trophy, after he won his second Amateur Championship and made the cut at the Masters. The trophy is "awarded each year to the individual, born or resident in Europe, or the European team, who have made the most outstanding contribution to golf in the preceding 12 months." He won again in 2001, as the award was given to the victorious 2001 Walker Cup team. The English Golf Union named McEvoy as the winner of the 1999 Gerald Micklem Award, given to those who have "made an outstanding contribution to further the interests of amateur golf in England." McEvoy was named an Officer of the Order of the British Empire on the 2003 Queen's New Year's Honours List, for "services to golf."

In February 2008, McEvoy devised and launched PowerPlay Golf, a shortened version of golf in a bid to create golf's version of Twenty20 cricket.

McEvoy lives in Tewkesbury, Gloucestershire, in England.

Books

Results in major championships

Note: McEvoy only played in the Masters Tournament and The Open Championship.

CUT = Missed the half-way cut
WD = Withdrew
"T" indicates a tie for a place

Team appearances
this list may be incomplete
European Amateur Team Championship (representing England): 1977 (individual leader), 1979 (winners), 1981 (winners), 1983, 1985, 1987, 1989
Walker Cup (representing Great Britain and Ireland): 1977, 1979, 1981, 1985, 1989 (winners), 1999 (non-playing captain), 2001 (non-playing captain)
Eisenhower Trophy (representing Great Britain and Ireland): 1978, 1980, 1984, 1986, 1988 (team winners and individual leader)
St Andrews Trophy (representing Great Britain and Ireland): 1978 (winners), 1980 (winners), 1984 (winners), 1986 (winners), 1988 (winners)

References

External links
Profile page at his company site
Profile at a charity golf tournament
Solihull council profile

English male golfers
Amateur golfers
Golf administrators
Golf course architects
Golfers from London
English male non-fiction writers
English sportswriters
Officers of the Order of the British Empire
1953 births
Living people